The Childcare Act 2006 (c 21) is an Act of the Parliament of the United Kingdom.

Summary
The Act defines new duties for Local Authorities with respect to:
improving the Every Child Matters outcomes for pre-school children
childcare for working parents 
parental information services

Structure of the Act
The Act comprises 4 sections:
Part 1 - duties on local authorities in England
Part 2 - duties on local authorities in Wales
Part 3 - regulation and inspection arrangements for childcare providers in England
Part 4 - general provisions

Early Years Foundation Stage
Sections 39-48 introduce the Early Years Foundation Stage (EYFS) which supports the delivery of high quality education and care for children from birth to age 5.

Section 109 - Commencement
The following orders have been made under this section:
The Childcare Act 2006 (Commencement No. 1) Order 2006 (S.I. 2006/3360 (C. 121))
The Childcare Act 2006 (Commencement No. 2 and Savings and Transitional Provisions) Order 2007 (S.I. 2007/1019 (C. 41))
The Childcare Act 2006 (Commencement No. 3 and Transitional Provision) Order 2007 (S.I. 2007/2717 (C. 106))
The Childcare Act 2006 (Commencement No. 4) Order 2008 (S.I. 2008/785 (C. 35))
The Childcare Act 2006 (Commencement No. 5 and Savings and Transitional Provisions) Order 2008 (S.I. 2008/2261 (C. 101))
The Childcare Act 2006 (Commencement No. 1) (Wales) Order 2008 (S.I. 2008/17 (W. 6))

Repeals 
This Act made minor amendments to various previous statutes.

References

External links
Every Child Matters

United Kingdom Acts of Parliament 2006
Children's rights in England
Children's rights in Wales
2006 in England
2006 in Wales
English family law
July 2006 events in the United Kingdom